The FIFA World Cup and Copa América, are the primary competitive tournaments the Colombia national football team enters. Excluding the tournament years in which Colombia either did not enter or failed to qualify for the finals, the Colombia national team has nominated the following squads of players to compete in the finals:

FIFA World Cups

1962 World Cup

Head coach:  Adolfo Pedernera

1990 World Cup

Head coach:  Francisco Maturana

1994 World Cup

Head coach:  Francisco Maturana

1998 World Cup

Head coach:  Hernán Darío Gómez

2014 World Cup

Head coach:  José Pékerman

South American Championships

1945 South American Championship

Head Coach:  Roberto Meléndez (also participated as footballer)

1949 South American Championship

Head Coach:  Friedrich Donnenfeld

1957 South American Championship

Head Coach:  Pedro López

1963 South American Championship

Head Coach:  Gabriel Ochoa Uribe

Copa América

1975 Copa América

Head coach:  Efraín Sánchez

1987 Copa América

Head coach:  Francisco Maturana

1989 Copa América

Head coach:  Francisco Maturana

1991 Copa América

Head coach:  Luis Augusto García

1993 Copa América

Head coach:  Francisco Maturana

1995 Copa América

Head coach:  Hernán Darío Gómez

1997 Copa América

Head coach:  Hernán Darío Gómez

1999 Copa América

Head coach:  Javier Alvarez

2001 Copa América

Head coach:  Francisco Maturana

2004 Copa América

Head coach:  Reinaldo Rueda

2007 Copa América

Head coach:  Jorge Luis Pinto

2011 Copa América

Head coach:  Hernán Darío Gómez

2015 Copa América

Head coach:  José Pékerman

2016 Copa América Centenario

Head coach:  José Pékerman

See also

 Colombia national football team results
 List of Colombia international footballers

References

Squads
Football